Dewal is a union council in Punjab, Pakistan.

Dewal may also refer to
Biron Dewal, a village in India
Ketakeshwar Dewal, a holy site in Assam, India
Dewal Dibyapur, a village in Nepal
Dewal Manal, a union council in Khyber-Pakhtunkhwa, Pakistan
Narayan Singh Dewal (born 1964), an Indian politician

See also
Deval (disambiguation)